Lamp is a surname.

Notable people with this surname
Anu Lamp (born 1958), Estonian actress
Charles Lamp (1895-1972), Australian politician
Dennis Lamp (born 1952), American baseball pitcher
Forrest Lamp (born 1994), American football player
Jeff Lamp (born 1959), American basketball player
Michael Lamp (born 1977), Danish badminton player
Peeter Lamp (born 1944), Estonian tennis player and coach

See also
Lamp (disambiguation)

English-language surnames
Estonian-language surnames